Felise Vaha'i Sosaia (born 30 July 1999) is a Wallisian athlete who specialises in the javelin throw.

Sosaia is from  Mata Utu. After practicing athletics in Wallis at the Kafika stadium, he left in 2016 for New Caledonia to study at the Jules Garnier high school in Nouméa. He then trained for a professional diploma in youth, popular education and sport in Koutio in parallel with his sports training.

At the 2019 Pacific Games in Apia he won a gold in the javelin with a throw of 62.41m. In July 2021, he won the French javelin championships. He won a bronze medal at the 2022 Mediterranean Games. At the 2022 European Athletics Championships he came 9th in his heat, and did not qualify for the final.

References

Living people
1999 births
Wallis and Futuna javelin throwers
French male javelin throwers